On 24 June 1938, elections were held for the Supreme Soviets of the Soviet Union's constituent republics.

According to Soviet law, 5,100,000 out of an eligible adult voting population of 93,411,000 were disenfranchised for various reasons.

See also 
 1938 Russian Supreme Soviet election
 1938 Ukrainian Supreme Soviet election

References
The Distinctiveness of Soviet Law. Ferdinand Joseph Maria Feldbrugge, ed. Martinus Nijhoff Publishers: Dordrecht (1987): 110.

1938 elections in the Soviet Union
Regional elections in the Soviet Union
June 1938 events